Freawine, Frowin or Frowinus figures as a governor of Schleswig in Gesta Danorum and in the Anglo-Saxon Chronicle as an ancestor of the kings of Wessex, but the latter source only tells that he was the son of Friðgar and the father of Wig.

In the Gesta Danorum, Frowin was the father-in-law of Offa of Angel (presented as a prince and later king of Denmark), whose father king Wermund liked both Frowin and his sons Ket and Wig.

Frowin was challenged to combat by the Myrging king Eadgils, and killed. He would later be avenged by his two sons Ket and Wig. However, the two sons fought against Athisl two against one, a national disgrace that was redeemed by their brother-in-law Offa, when he killed two Saxons at the same time, in "single combat". This event is referred to in Widsith as a duel against Eadgils of the Myrgings.

While Freawine appears in the pedigree of the Wessex kings in the Anglo-Saxon Chronicle, he is absent from the pedigree of these kings given in the Anglian collection on Anglo-Saxon royal pedigrees, as well as in a similar pedigree in one transcript of Asser's Vita Ælfredi regis Angul Saxonum. Freawine's appearance in the Chronicle's Wessex royal pedigree has been suggested to be an interpolation of this heroic figure along with his son Wig into a pre-existing pedigree that had been borrowed from the Bernician royal house, and that the name given to the father of Freawine in the pedigree, Friðgar, was added later simply to allow poetic alliteration within the lineage.

Notes

External links
 The Anglo-Saxon Chronicle at Project Gutenberg - Public domain copy.
Book Four of Gesta Danorum at the Medieval and Classical Literature Library
Peter Tunstall's translation of the Chronicon lethrense at The Chronicle of the Kings of Lejre.

Anglish warriors